Natatolana debrae is a species of crustacean in the family Cirolanidae, and was first described by Stephen John Keable in 2006. The species epithet, debrae, honours Keable's wife, Debra.

It is a dimorphic, benthic species, found on tidal and subtidal flats, and known only from Gulf Saint Vincent. It is a scavenger.

References

External links
Natatolana debrae occurrence data from GBIF

Cymothoida
Crustaceans of Australia
Crustaceans described in 2006
Taxa named by Stephen John Keable